Hänel is a German surname. Notable people with the surname include:
 Albert Hänel (1833–1918), German jurist and politician
 Erich Hänel (1915–2003), German footballer
 Horst-Ulrich Hänel (born 1957), German field hockey player
 Karin Hänel (born 1957), German long jumper
 Klaus Hänel (1936–2016), German footballer
 Kristina Hänel, (born 1956), German physician
  (1792–1878), German legal historian

See also
 Hanel

German-language surnames